Aleksei Alekseyevich Volkov (1890–1942) was a Russian Soviet statesman and first secretary of the Byelorussian SSR during the Soviet Union.

1890 births
1942 deaths
People from Kasimovsky District
People from Kasimovsky Uyezd
Russian Social Democratic Labour Party members
Old Bolsheviks
Heads of the Communist Party of Byelorussia
Presidium of the Supreme Soviet
First convocation members of the Soviet of the Union
Soviet military personnel of the Russian Civil War